is a 1959 samurai film directed by Hiroshi Inagaki and starring Toshiro Mifune. Its story is an adaptation of the 1897 Edmond Rostand play Cyrano de Bergerac, and its basic plot faithfully follows that of the play. The film was released in the English-speaking world with the title Samurai Saga.

In the film, Mifune plays a samurai named Heihachiro Komaki, who is analogous to the Cyrano character. Yoko Tsukasa plays Komaki's love interest, Princess Chiyo, who is analogous to Cyrano's love interest, Roxane.

At the end of the film, when the mortally wounded Komaki visits Princess Chiyo at her convent to bring her the latest news of the outside world, he mentions the defeat of Kojirō Sasaki in a duel by the famed samurai Musashi Miyamoto. Prior to filming Life of an Expert Swordsman, Mifune had played Miyamoto in Samurai Trilogy, also directed by Inagaki, which chronicled Miyamoto's life, culminating in his legendary duel with Sasaki.

Cast 
 Toshiro Mifune : Komaki Heihachiro 
 Yoko Tsukasa : Lady Chiyo
 Akira Takarada : Karibe Jurota
 Keiko Awaji : Nanae
 Kamatari Fujiwara : Rakuzo
 Sachio Sakai : Hayashida
 Akihiko Hirata : Akahishi Sakon
 Yoshio Inaba : Shiraishi Genpachi

References

External links

1959 films
Films based on Cyrano de Bergerac (play)
Samurai films
Jidaigeki films
Films directed by Hiroshi Inagaki
Films produced by Tomoyuki Tanaka
Japanese films based on plays
1950s Japanese films